The Beatles-Platz is a plaza in the St. Pauli quarter in Hamburg, Germany, at the crossroads of Reeperbahn and Große Freiheit. Surrounding the place are five statues, representing The Beatles:  John Lennon, Paul McCartney, Stuart Sutcliffe, George Harrison, and a hybrid of drummers Pete Best and Ringo Starr each of whom played with The Beatles at times during their Hamburg engagements.

This plaza was built to commemorate Hamburg's importance in The Beatles' history. The draft design was by architects Dohse & Stich during a common tendering. Building the project cost about €500,000 and was split among donations, sponsors and the city of Hamburg.

The project's initiator was Hamburg radio station Oldie 95. On the station's instigation the community of interest IG Beat City was founded, which considers The Beatles-Platz as a prelude for more projects targeting The Beatles' memorisation in Hamburg's cityscape.

After Hamburg's First Mayor Ole von Beust and Minister of Culture Karin von Welck gave the senate's consent for the project, construction began. The first drawing saw the construction started around December 2005–January 2006, overall costs of €100,000 and a completion in May 2006, in time for the Football World Cup.

On 29 May 2008 at 13:00, construction began with the symbolic groundbreaking, which was done by the initiator Stephan Heller. Uriz von Oertzen (Hi-Life Entertainment), Frank Otto, Dr. Karin von Welck (minister of culture), Markus Schreiber (head of borough exchange Hamburg-Mitte) and Prof. Jörn Walter (construction supervisor).

Construction continued for approximately three months, and ceremonial opening took place on 11 September 2008 presided over by the city's First Mayor. The Beatles memorial consists of metal statues of the band members as well as song names of successful songs. The initial engravings held some spelling mistakes such as Drive me car, Sgt. Peppers Lonely Hearts Club Band and Can't Buy Melove , which could not be corrected before completion. By now the incorrect plates have been exchanged.

References

External links

 www.beatles-platz.tv
 Pictures of the Beatles-Platz

Squares in Hamburg
Buildings and structures in Hamburg-Mitte
Monuments and memorials to the Beatles
2008 establishments in Germany
Tourist attractions in Hamburg